Elaphidion cryptum is a species of beetle in the family Cerambycidae which was described by Linsley in 1963.

References

cryptum
Beetles described in 1963